José Luis Varela Lagunas (born 21 December 1946) is a Mexican politician formerly affiliated with the Citizens' Movement. As of 2014 he served as Deputy of the LX Legislature of the Mexican Congress representing Oaxaca.

References

1946 births
Living people
People from Oaxaca
Citizens' Movement (Mexico) politicians
21st-century Mexican politicians
Deputies of the LX Legislature of Mexico
Members of the Chamber of Deputies (Mexico) for Oaxaca